Under the terms of the Constitution of Belarus, the next Belarusian presidential election is to be held in 2025. The president is elected directly to serve a five-year term.

Mass protests erupted following the disputed outcome of the 2020 election in which incumbent Alexander Lukashenko claimed victory. Opposition candidate Sviatlana Tsikhanouskaya subsequently claimed to have received between 60 and 70% of the vote and asked the international community to recognise her as the winner of the election.

On 17 August 2020, Lukashenko stated that the next presidential election could be held earlier than 2025 if a new constitution were to be adopted. Opposition candidate Tsikhanouskaya stated that she was ready to lead a transitional government and to hold early elections under international supervision. Lukashenko also said that he will resign if a new constitution is adopted.

Opinion polls

References

Presidential elections in Belarus
Belarus